Takifugu variomaculatus is a species of pufferfish in the family Tetraodontidae. It is native to the Northwest Pacific, where it is known from China. It is a demersal species that reaches 13.7 cm (5.4 inches) SL.

References 

variomaculatus
Taxa named by Li Chun-Sheng
Taxa named by Kuang Yong-De
Fish described in 2002